Harold W. Giard is a former Democratic member of the Vermont State Senate, representing the Addison senate district.

Harold W. Giard was first elected to the Vermont State Senate in 2004, and was reelected in 2006.

Biography 

Giard grew up in Bridport, Vermont. After graduating from Middlebury Union High School, he attended St. Michael's College.

He is married to Shirley Giard. The couple have one daughter.

Giard is a former dairy farmer.

Public life 

Giard was elected to the Vermont House of Representatives in 1972 and continued to serve there until 1980.

He was elected to the Vermont Senate in 2004.

In June 2012 Giard told The Addison Independent that he would not be seeking a fifth term in the Vermont Senate.

See also 

 Members of the Vermont Senate, 2005-2006 session
 Members of the Vermont Senate, 2007-2008 session

References

External links 
Vermont Senate Biographies

Living people
Members of the Vermont House of Representatives
Vermont state senators
People from Bridport, Vermont
Year of birth missing (living people)